Zoich (Cyrillic: Зойч) was a proposed mascot for the XXII Winter Olympics from the official online poll to select a mascot for the 2014 Sochi games. Despite being a popular Internet character, the committee chose not to introduce it to the final round of the voting. Upon introduction and until the end of the online voting, it was the most popular mascot from those submitted. It also took only about 40 minutes for Zoich to take the top spot.

Zoich can be considered example of guerrilla marketing, as the artist was commissioned by the 2014 Olympic Committee to create a mascot which would serve as an advertisement for the competition. It was revealed in June 2011 that Zoich was not a genuine independent entry into the competition in a statement from the president of Sochi 2014 Olympic and Paralympic Organizing Committee.

Background
September 1, 2010: The Organizing Committee of the 2014 Sochi Winter Olympic and Paralympic Games, in conjunction with the newspaper Izvestia, announced an open online competition to select the mascots for the 2014 games. The competition receives 24,048 entries from across Russia and Russians abroad.

September 10, 2010: Moscow artist and designer Yegor Zhgun entered an original sketch of an imaginary frog, naming it "Zoich".

According to its author, the idea of Zoich was influenced by the character Hypnotoad from Futurama.

Description of the mascot
Zoich is a fuzzy blue frog. The Olympic Rings rotate in its eyes, taking the role of pupils: black, yellow, and blue in the right eye and red and green in the left. In its mouth, the frog holds a ski pole and a Russian Imperial Crown sits atop its head. The mascot takes its name from the year "2014" as it is represented on the Olympiad's logo: The numbers 2, 0, and 1 as they are represented look like the Latin Z, O, and I. The number 4 looks like the Russian letter Ч, which is like the English "ch". Many Russian-speaking people read "2014" as "Zoich" upon presentation of Sochi-2014 logo. Zhgun's description of his mascot: "The Olympic Rings in his eyes spell the progress of Olympic ideals; the tsars’ crown on his head recalls authority and faith."

Subsequent event
After Zhgun posted an animated clip  of his mascot on YouTube on November 8, 2010, showing Zoich in motion, the press dubbed the mascot "Hypnotoad", referencing its obvious resemblance to the character Hypnotoad from American animated TV series Futurama. In July 2011, Futurama referenced the influence of the Hypnotoad on Zoich; in the opening sequence of the episode "All the Presidents' Heads". The 20th episode of the show's sixth season, shows a brief clip from Zhgun's original Zoich animated clip mounted on a television screen.

The registration of intellectual rights to Zoich, by the Sochi 2014 Organizing Committee, was revealed on June 14, 2011. The idea that Zoich was not a legitimate independent entry to the competition was deemed so far-fetched that it required statements from the Sochi 2014 Organizing Committee and Zhgun to convince journalists of its legitimacy.

References

External links
 Анастасия Резниченко Скажи-ка, френд / Журнал «Итоги» № 47(754) от 22.11. 2010
 Дмитрий Лифанцев Олимпийская жаба / Экспресс Газета № 46 (823) от 15 11. 2010
  Article on Zoich's disqualification from the 2014 Olympic mascot competition by Comedy Central Insider, the news blog of Comedy Central, which broadcasts Futurama.
 Zoich creation process from Zhgun's studio (i.e. his employer).
  uploaded by Zhgun.

2014 Winter Olympics
Fictional frogs
Fictional Russian people